Kerenyovo (Kerän) is a rural locality (a selo) in Akhmetovsky Selsoviet, Kushnarenkovsky District, Bashkortostan, Russia. The population was 40 as of 2010. There are 5 streets.

Geography 
Kerenyovo is located 26 km northeast of Kushnarenkovo (the district's administrative centre) by road. Akhlystino is the nearest rural locality.

References 

Rural localities in Kushnarenkovsky District